The 1882 South Australian Football Association season was the 6th season of the top-level Australian rules football competition in South Australia. The season began on Saturday 6 May.

The 1882 SAFA season was the first time that the league used behinds in determining game results.

The Royal Park Football Club entered the competition, but they folded after five matches, their remaining five scheduled matches were declared forfeits.

 went on to record its 5th consecutive premiership.

Premiership season

Round 1

Round 2

Round 3

Round 4

Round 5

Round 6

Round 7

Round 8

Round 9

Round 10

Round 11

Round 12

Round 13

Round 14

Round 15

Round 16

Round 17

Round 18

Ladder 

Note: Royal Park only played five matches, forfeiting one due to a lack of players, while the other four were forfeits after the club dropped out of the SAFA and folded.

References 

SANFL
South Australian National Football League seasons